Georges Dever (24 November 1904 – 3 January 1947) was a French racing cyclist. He rode in the 1929 Tour de France.

References

1904 births
1947 deaths
French male cyclists
Place of birth missing